HMS Seymour has been the name of more than one ship of the British Royal Navy:

 , a destroyer leader launched in 1916 and sold in 1930
 , a frigate in service from 1943 to 1946

Royal Navy ship names